Verticordia fimbrilepis, commonly known as shy featherflower, is a flowering plant in the myrtle family, Myrtaceae and is endemic to the south-west of Western Australia. It is a small, bushy shrub with one openly branched main stem at its base, small, pointed leaves and rounded groups of pink flowers near the ends of the branches.

Description
Those near the flowers are more oblong to narrow egg-shaped.

Flowering time is from November to December or January.

Taxonomy and naming
Verticordia fimbrilepis was first formally described by Nikolai Turczaninow in 1847 and the description was published in the Bulletin de la Société Impériale des Naturalistes de Moscou from specimens collected by James Drummond. The specific epithet (fimbrilepis) is "from the Latin fimbria (fringe) and the Greek lepis (a scale), probably in reference to the staminodes".

In 1991, Alex George described two subspecies and the names have been accepted by the Australian Plant Census:

When Alex George reviewed the genus Verticordia in 1991, he placed this species in subgenus Verticordia, section Verticordia along with V. crebra, V. helichrysantha, V. plumosa, V. stenopetala, V. sieberi, V. harveyi and V. pityrhops.

Distribution and habitat
This verticordia grows in low-level sandy areas in heath, shrubland and wandoo woodland in scattered areas near Brookton and Narrogin in the Avon Wheatbelt, Jarrah Forest and Warren biogeographic regions.

Conservation
This verticordia is classified as "not threatened" but both subspecies are classified as "Threatened" by the Western Australian Government Department of Parks and Wildlife meaning that they are likely to become extinct or are rare, or otherwise in need of special protection. Subspecies fimbrilepis is also classed as "Endangered" (EN) under the Australian Government Environment Protection and Biodiversity Conservation Act 1999 (EPBC Act) and an interim recovery plan has been prepared. Subspecies australis has been classed as "Vulnerable" under the same Act.

Use in horticulture
Both subspecies of V. fimbrilepis are small open shrubs with dainty pink flowers but only subsp. australis has so far proved amenable to propagation, and only in Western Australia.

References

fimbrilepis
Rosids of Western Australia
Eudicots of Western Australia
Plants described in 1847
Taxa named by Nikolai Turczaninow